Ladies of the Road is a live two CD set by the band King Crimson, recorded in 1971 & 1972, released in 2002, and reissued in 2008 in Japan. It is named after a song on the Islands album.

The first disc consists of concert recordings performed by the band's second touring lineup: guitarist/keyboardist Robert Fripp, vocalist/bass guitarist Boz Burrell, saxophonist/flautist/
keyboardist Mel Collins, drummer/backing vocalist  Ian Wallace, and lyricist Peter Sinfield- who operated a VCS3 synthesizer, the soundboard and the lights during live shows. The second disc consists of excerpts from different performances of the song "21st Century Schizoid Man" from the 1971 and 1972 tours, edited together to form a single 46 + minute “extended” version of the song.

This set was compiled in part from King Crimson Collectors' Club albums - limited release live recordings of concert performances, studio sessions and radio sessions.

Track listing

Disc 1
"Pictures of a City" (Robert Fripp, Peter Sinfield) - 8:46
from the album King Crimson Live at Summit Studios
"The Letters" (Fripp, Sinfield) - 4:42
from the album King Crimson Live at Plymouth Guildhall
"Formentera Lady (abridged)" (Fripp, Sinfield) - 6:41
abridged, from the album Live in Detroit, MI
"The Sailor's Tale" (Fripp) - 5:43
abridged, from the album Live in Detroit, MI
"Cirkus" (Fripp, Sinfield) - 7:58
from the album Live in Detroit, MI
"Groon" (Fripp) - 6:52
abridged, from the album King Crimson Live at Summit Studios
"Get Thy Bearings" (Donovan Leitch, arr. by Boz Burrell, Mel Collins, Fripp, Ian Wallace) - 8:33
abridged, from the album April 13, 1971 - Zoom Club, Frankfurt, Germany
"21st Century Schizoid Man" (Fripp, Michael Giles, Greg Lake, Ian McDonald, Sinfield) - 8:57
from the album King Crimson Live at Summit Studios
"In the Court of the Crimson King" (McDonald, Sinfield) - 0:48
from the album Live in Detroit, MI

Disc 2
"21st Century Schizoid Man" (Fripp, Giles, Lake, McDonald, Sinfield) - 1:44
Baseball Park, Jacksonville, Florida - 26 February 1972
"Schizoid Men" (edit 1) (Burrell, Collins, Fripp, Wallace) - 4:46
Baseball Park, Jacksonville, Florida - 26 February 1972
"Schizoid Men" (edit 2) (Burrell, Collins, Fripp, Wallace) - 3:12
Sound Track, Denver - 14 March 1972
"Schizoid Men" (edit 3) (Burrell, Collins, Fripp, Wallace) - 5:15
Kemp Coliseum, Orlando, Florida - 27 February 1972
"Schizoid Men" (edit 4) (Burrell, Collins, Fripp, Wallace) - 6:22
Armoury, Wilmington - 11 February 1972 (Late Show)
"Schizoid Men" (edit 5) (Burrell, Collins, Fripp, Wallace) - 3:56
Sound Track, Denver - 13 March 1972
"Schizoid Men" (edit 6) (Burrell, Collins, Fripp, Wallace) - 5:13
Cinderella Ballroom, Detroit - 18 February 1972
"Schizoid Men" (edit 7) (Burrell, Collins, Fripp, Wallace) - 3:18
Armoury, Wilmington - 11 February 1972 (Early Show)
"Schizoid Men" (edit 8) (Burrell, Collins, Fripp, Wallace) - 5:01
Unidentified Show #2 - 1972
"Schizoid Men" (edit 9) (Burrell, Collins, Fripp, Wallace) - 3:23
The Barn, Peoria - March 10, 1972
"Schizoid Men" (edit 10) (Burrell, Collins, Fripp, Wallace) - 4:56
Academy Of Music, New York - February 12, 1972 (Late Show)
"Schizoid Men" (edit 11) (Burrell, Collins, Fripp, Wallace) - 5:42 (n.b. actually a continuation of track 11)
Academy Of Music, New York - February 12, 1972 (Early Show)
Riverside Theater, Milwaukee - March 8, 1972

Personnel
Robert Fripp – guitar, mellotron
Boz Burrell – bass guitar, lead vocals
Mel Collins – saxophone, flute, mellotron
Ian Wallace – drums, percussion, backing vocals
Peter Sinfield – VCS3

Charts

References

2002 live albums
King Crimson live albums
Discipline Global Mobile albums